The Tamil and Malayali name Ramachandran may refer to:
 A. Ramachandran (born 1935), an Indian painter
 C. R. Ramachandran, an Indian politician
 G. Ramachandran (1904–1995), an Indian social reformer and politician
 Gopalasamudram Narayana Iyer Ramachandran (1922–2001), an Indian biophysicist known for creating the Ramachandran plot
 K. V. Ramachandran (1898–1956), an Indian music and art critic
 M. Ramachandran, an Indian politician
 M. G. Ramachandran, also known as MGR, (1917–1987), an Indian film actor and former Chief Minister of Tamil Nadu
 N. S. Ramachandran (born 1908 (?)), an Indian composer of Carnatic music
 P. P. Ramachandran, an Indian poet
 R. Ramachandran, an Indian poet
 Subramaniam Ramachandran, a missing Sri Lankan journalist
 T. Ramachandran (1944–2000), an Indian author
 T. Ramachandran (politician), an Indian politician
 T. A. Ramachandran (1912–1951), an Indian cricket umpire
 T. K. Ramachandran (died 1993), an Indian film actor and producer
 T. N. Ramachandran (1903–1973), an Indian art historian, artist, archaeologist, and Sanskrit scholar
 T. R. Ramachandran (1917–1990), an Indian actor and comedian
 V. S. Ramachandran (born 1951), an Indian-American neuroscientist
 Asogan Ramesh Ramachandren (c. 1973–1998), a Singaporean convicted murderer

First name
 Ramachandran Ramesh (born 1976), an Indian chess grandmaster
 N. Ramachandran Gingee (born 1944), an Indian politician
 S. Ramachandran Pillai (born 1938), an Indian politician

See also
 Ramachandran plot, a biochemical method
 Ramachandra, a deity of Hinduism

Indian surnames